The Ernstbrunn Formation is a geologic formation in Austria and the Czech Republic. It preserves fossils dated to the Jurassic period.

See also

 List of fossiliferous stratigraphic units in Austria

References
 

Geologic formations of Austria
Geologic formations of the Czech Republic
Jurassic Austria
Jurassic System of Europe
Tithonian Stage